Anaïs Lagougine (born 24 September 1981) is a French female rugby union player. She represented  at the 2010 Women's Rugby World Cup. She was a member of the 2013 Rugby World Cup Sevens squad.

References

1981 births
Living people
French female rugby union players
Female rugby sevens players
Place of birth missing (living people)
France international women's rugby sevens players